The list of ship launches in 1663 includes a chronological list of some ships launched in 1663.

References 

Lists of ship launches
1663 in transport
1660s ships